Ragan (also known as Devil's Angel) is a 1968 Spanish-Italian Eurospy film directed by José Briz Méndez  and starring  Ty Hardin and Antonella Lualdi.

Plot
 
A former mercenary named Ragan, who now runs a one-plane, money-losing air-transport service, is approached by a man named Velludo with a $75,000 job offer. Velludo wants Ragan to fly a plane in a mission to free Moreno, the former dictator of a Caribbean island. Ragan says "no" but his plane is mysteriously destroyed in a fire and his insurance is suddenly cancelled so "no" becomes "yes." After all, Moreno is preferable to Chavez, the current dictator, and Ragan will have to chance to meet up with an ex-flame named Janine who's also involved in the planned coup along with her husband. Complicating things, however, is Maria, an attractive blonde with the "hots" for Ragan. Ragan and company incur heavy losses but manage to free Moreno in a daring commando raid and Ragan now looks forward to a romantic future with one of those two women.

Cast  
  Ty Hardin as  Lee Ragan
  Antonella Lualdi as  Janine Kohler
  Gustavo Rojo as   Velludo 
  Giacomo Rossi Stuart as  Kohler (as Jack Stuart)
  Rossella Como as  Maria
  Ricardo Palacios as  Flower
  José María Caffarel as  'Uncle' Borrell

References

External links

Spanish adventure films
Spanish spy thriller films
Italian adventure films
Italian spy thriller films
1960s spy thriller films
Italian aviation films
Fictional mercenaries
Films about mercenaries
Films scored by Nico Fidenco
Spanish aviation films
1960s Italian films
1960s Spanish films